Tiberio di Tito (1573–1627) was an Italian painter. He was born in Florence. He was the son and pupil of the late-Mannerist painter Santi di Tito. He specialized in portrait painting, including small pencil portraits, on which he was much employed by Cardinal Leopoldo de' Medici.

References

16th-century Italian painters
Italian male painters
17th-century Italian painters
Painters from Florence
Renaissance painters
Italian Baroque painters
Italian portrait painters
1573 births
1627 deaths